Leonard Roy Harmon (January 21, 1917 – November 13, 1942) was an American sailor who died in action during World War II and was posthumously awarded the Navy Cross for his valor.

Life
Harmon was born in Cuero, Texas, on January 21, 1917. He attended the segregated all-black Daule High School before working in livestock production. During the Great Depression, he performed various house and grounds chores for the owner of the historic William Frobese home in Cuero. He was 22 years of age when he enlisted in the United States Navy in June 1939 at a San Antonio recruiting station. He reported for training in Norfolk, Virginia, before reporting for duty on the cruiser  on October 28, 1939. He trained as a Mess Attendant, one of the few jobs available to black men in the navy at that time. The basic job description consisted of serving food to officers and crew aboard ship. However, like all members of a ship's crew they were also trained in damage control and had stations to report to during general quarters.

During his service, Harmon became a Mess Attendant First Class and was serving aboard the San Francisco during the Naval Battle of Guadalcanal. On November 13, 1942, San Francisco was raked by Japanese gunfire during the battle, killing nearly every officer on the bridge. Harmon rushed in to evacuate the wounded. He was then assigned to assist Pharmacist's Mate Lyndford Bondsteel in evacuating and caring for the wounded. While the ship was being raked by enemy gunfire, Harmon helped evacuate the wounded to a dressing station. While doing so he deliberately stood between Bondsteel and enemy gunfire in order to protect his wounded shipmate. This action resulted in his death.

Honors
Harmon was awarded the Navy Cross posthumously in March 1943. Additionally, two ships were named in his honor.  had been provisionally named  but was transferred to the Royal Navy prior to completion. The  served from 1943 to 1947 and remained in the Reserve Fleet until 1967; it was the first US warship to be named after an African American. Harmon's heroism was also commemorated by the naming and dedication of Harmon Hall, bachelor enlisted quarters at Naval Air Station North Island, on July 29, 1975, and with a state historical marker placed at the Cuero Municipal Park in 1977. A poster of him hangs in the National Portrait Gallery in Washington, DC.

Navy Cross citation

References

External links
 His marker at the Navy Mess Attendant School

1917 births
1942 deaths
African Americans in World War II
United States Navy personnel killed in World War II
People from Cuero, Texas
Military personnel from Texas
People in food and agriculture occupations
Recipients of the Navy Cross (United States)
African-American United States Navy personnel